Léglise is a municipality of Wallonia, located in the province of Luxembourg, Belgium.

Population
On 1 January 2007 the municipality, had 4,178 inhabitants, giving a population density of 24.2 inhabitants per km².

Area
The municipality covers 172.92 km².

Sub-Municipalities
The municipality consists of the following districts :

Assenois, Ébly, Léglise, Mellier, and Witry.

Other population centers include :

See also
 List of protected heritage sites in Léglise

References

External links
 

 
Municipalities of Luxembourg (Belgium)